Cylindridia is a genus of flower weevils in the beetle family Curculionidae, with currently seven valid names included. The species occur from Canada to Argentina.

Species
 Cylindridia andersoni Prena, 2012
 Cylindridia fuscipes Prena, 2006
 Cylindridia latisquama Prena, 2012
 Cylindridia prolixa (LeConte, 1876)
 Cylindridia propinqua Prena, 2006
 Cylindridia rubripes Prena, 2006
 Cylindridia sanguinea (Hustache, 1939)

No longer valid (all junior subjective synonyms of C. prolixa):
 Cylindridia nitidissima (Casey, 1892)
 Cylindridia perexilis Casey, 1920
 Cylindridia simulator Casey, 1920

Biology
At least four species develop in the culm of Cyperaceae.

References

Further reading

 

Baridinae
Articles created by Qbugbot